was a Japanese politician and a significant member of the Liberal Democratic Party (LDP). He was speaker of the House of Representatives of which he was a member for 53 years.

Early life and education
Sakurauchi was born in Tokyo on 8 May 1912. He was the son of Yukio Sakurauchi, a lower house member and finance minister. Yoshio Sakurauchi attended the Keio schools from kindergarten through Keio University. His brother, Kimio, served as president (from 1961) and chairman of the board of directors (from 1971) at Chugoku Electric.

Career
Sakurauchi began his political career in 1947 when he was first elected to the lower house of Parliament. His constituency included Kashima. He served at the lower house for 18 terms. He was also once elected to the upper house, serving there for 19 months.

He held different ministerial and party posts in his career. In addition, he was leader of the Kano faction in the LDP. This faction was renamed as the Nakasone faction in 1965. His leadership of the faction lasted until 1989. Then the faction was headed by Michio Watanabe.

In addition, he served as foreign minister, agriculture minister, minister of international trade and industry and construction minister. Prime Minister Hayato Ikeda appointed Sakurauchi the minister of international trade and industry on 18 July 1964. Sakurauchi continued to serve in the same post in the next cabinet headed by Prime Minister Eisaku Satō, but he was fired and replaced by Miki Takeo in June 1965. On 28 April 1977, Sakurauchi was appointed construction minister to the government of Takeo Fukuda in a cabinet reshuffle, replacing Shiro Hasegawa in the post. Sakurauchi served as construction minister until 7 December 1978.

He was appointed the secretary general of the LDP on 16 November 1979. During his term, he called for making the Yasukuni Shrine a state shrine. His term lasted until 30 November 1981 when he was named foreign minister. Susumu Nikaido replaced him as the secretary general of the LDP. He was appointed foreign minister in the cabinet led by Prime Minister Zenkō Suzuki on 30 November 1981, replacing Sunao Sonoda in the post.

Sakurachi also served as the head of the LDP's chief policy-making body. In addition, he was appointed speaker of Japan's lower house of parliament on 27 February 1990, replacing Hajime Tamura in the post. In January 1992, he argued that the United States' economic problems resulted from its work force since the US workers were "too lazy" to compete with Japan, and  that nearly a third of its workers "cannot even read." Sakurachi's term as speaker ended on 18 June 1993 and Takako Doi became the speaker.

Besides these positions, Sakurauchi was named as the first chairman of the League for Japan-Vietnam Friendship that was established by Japanese and Vietnamese politicians in 1974 to promote mutual understanding and friendship between Japan and Vietnam.

Sakurauchi was not included in the LDP's proportional representation list for the 25 June 2000 general elections, and he stated that he would retire from politics. Eventually, he retired from politics in June 2000.

Death and funeral
Sakurauchi died of respiratory failure at a Tokyo hospital on 5 July 2003. He was 91. His funeral service was held at Ikegami Hommonji Temple in Tokyo's Ota Ward on 8 July 2003.

Honors
In 1986, Sakurauchi, a former board member of the Boy Scouts of Japan and President of the Scout Parliamentary Caucus, received the 185th Bronze Wolf Award of the World Scout Committee for services to world Scouting. In 1981 he also received the highest distinction of the Scout Association of Japan, the Golden Pheasant Award.

The Government of India awarded him the third highest civilian honour of the Padma Bhushan, in 1989, for his contributions to public affairs.

References

External links

|-

|-

|-

|-

|-

|-

|-

|-

|-

|-

|-

|-

|-

|-

20th-century Japanese politicians
1912 births
2003 deaths
Foreign ministers of Japan
Government ministers of Japan
Keio University alumni
Liberal Democratic Party (Japan) politicians
Members of the House of Representatives (Japan)
Recipients of the Bronze Wolf Award
Recipients of the Padma Bhushan in public affairs
Scouting in Japan
Speakers of the House of Representatives (Japan)